Boronia anomala is a plant in the citrus family Rutaceae and is only known from a single population growing under an overhang in a sandstone gorge in the Kimberley Australia region of Western Australia. It is an erect, mostly hairless shrub with pinnate leaves and four-petalled flowers.

Description

Taxonomy and naming
Boronia anomala was first formally described in 1999 by Marco Duretto who published the description in Muelleria from a specimen collected near Kalumburu. The specific epithet (anomala) is derived from the Latin word anomalus meaning "diverging from the normal" or "abnormal", referring to the unusual features of this boronia, compared to others growing in the Kimberley region.

Distribution and habitat
This boronia is only known from the type location, growing under an overhang in a sandstone gorge.

Conservation
Boronia anomala is classified as "Priority One" by the Government of Western Australia Department of Parks and Wildlife, meaning that it is known from only one or a few locations which are potentially at risk.

References 

anomala 
Flora of Western Australia
Plants described in 1997
Taxa named by Marco Duretto